İMECE is an earth observation satellite designed and developed by TÜBİTAK Space Technologies Research Institute (TÜBİTAK UZAY) and produced in Turkey to provide high resolution imagery.

Project
The IMECE Satellite Systems Infrastructure Project was included in the 2013 investment program of the Ministry of Development. With the experience of BİLSAT-1, RASAT and Göktürk-2, the investment program supported "IMECE Satellite Subsystems Development Project" was initiated in order to establish the infrastructure required for the domestic development of satellite subsystems that can be used in satellites of submeter-class precision resolution electro-optical satellite camera and communication systems. It aims to develop star tracker, sun sensor, electric propulsion system, payload data record compression formatting unit and new generation flight computer in high resolution imaging satellites and transform it into economic value.

The IMECE Satellite Project, supported by Scientific and Technological Research Council of Turkey (TÜBİTAK), started in January 2017. In June 2020, the assembly integration activities of the spacecraft's thermal structural efficiency module was completed, and tests for the vibration on the spacecraft started. The assembly activities of the flight module followed those tests. As of January 2023, the satellite is expected to be launched from the United States in the first quarter of 2023.

Characteristics
The spacecraft is manufactured by TÜBİTAK Space Technologies Research Institute (TÜBİTAK UZAY) at the Turkish Aerospace Industries  (TUSAŞ) facility in Kahramankazan, Ankara.

References

Earth observation satellites of Turkey
Scientific and Technological Research Council of Turkey
2023 in spaceflight
Earth imaging satellites